The 1995 Rutgers Scarlet Knights football team represented Rutgers University in the 1995 NCAA Division I-A football season. In their sixth and final season under head coach Doug Graber, the Scarlet Knights compiled a 4–7 record, were outscored by opponents 412 to 304, and finished in sixth place in the Big East Conference. The team's statistical leaders included Ray Lucas with 2,180 passing yards, Terrell Willis with 773 rushing yards, and Marco Battaglia with 894 receiving yards.

Schedule

Roster

Game summaries

Duke

Navy

Penn State

Syracuse

Miami (FL)

Virginia Tech

Pitt

West Virginia

Tulane

Temple

Boston College

References

Rutgers
Rutgers Scarlet Knights football seasons
Rutgers Scarlet Knights football